Now Listen may refer to:

 Now Listen (The Chocolate Rockets album), 2005
 Now Listen (James Husband album), 2005
 Now, Listen!, a 2001 album by Solid Steel
 Now Listen, a 2007 album by Shakin' Stevens